The Comstock Covered Bridge is a wooden covered bridge that crosses the Trout River in Montgomery, Vermont on Comstock Bridge Road.  Built in 1883, it is one of several area bridges built by Sheldon & Savannah Jewett.  It was listed on the National Register of Historic Places in 1974.

Description and history
The Comstock Covered Bridge stands just west of the Montgomery Village, carrying Comstock Bridge Road over the Trout River south of Vermont Route 118. The exterior is clad in vertical board siding, and it is covered by a metal roof. The portal ends are also finished in vertical board siding, which extends a short way inside, and whose exterior parts are normally painted white.

The bridge was built in 1883 by Sheldon & Savannah Jewett, brothers who lived in Montgomery.  The Jewett brothers are credited with building six surviving bridges in Montgomery as well as some in surrounding communities, representing one of the best-documented concentrations of bridges by a single builder in the state.  The original timber for the bridge was prepared by the Jewetts at their mill in Montgomery's West Hill area.

A complete renovation of the bridge was carried out by Blow & Cote, of Morrisville, Vermont, in 2003.  A comprehensive series of articles chronicling the work can be found at the Vermont Covered Bridges web site.

See also
 
 
 
 
 List of covered bridges in Vermont
 National Register of Historic Places listings in Franklin County, Vermont
 List of bridges on the National Register of Historic Places in Vermont

References

Buildings and structures in Montgomery, Vermont
Bridges completed in 1883
Covered bridges on the National Register of Historic Places in Vermont
Wooden bridges in Vermont
Covered bridges in Franklin County, Vermont
National Register of Historic Places in Franklin County, Vermont
Road bridges on the National Register of Historic Places in Vermont
Lattice truss bridges in the United States
1883 establishments in Vermont